In Greek mythology, the name Iphidamas (Ancient Greek: Ἰφιδάμας, gen. Ἰφιδάμαντος) may refer to:

 Iphidamas, also known as Amphidamas, son of Aleus and counted as one of the Argonauts.
 Iphidamas (or Amphidamas), a son of Busiris killed by Heracles.
 Iphidamas, a son of Antenor and Theano, and the brother of Crino, Acamas, Agenor, Antheus, Archelochus, Coön, Demoleon, Eurymachus, Glaucus, Helicaon, Laodamas, Laodocus, Medon, Polybus,  and Thersilochus. He was raised in Thrace by his maternal grandfather Cisseus, who sought to make him stay at home when the Trojan War broke out, by giving him his daughter in marriage for a bride price of a hundred cows and a thousand goats and sheep. Nevertheless, Iphidamas did leave for Troy the next day after the wedding. He led twelve ships, but left them at Percote and came to Troy by land. He confronted Agamemnon in battle, but his spear bent against the opponent's silver belt, whereupon Agamemnon killed Iphidamas with a sword and stripped him of his armor. He then also fought and killed his brother Coön, who attempted to avenge the death of Iphidamas.
Iphidamas, one of the Suitors of Penelope who came from Dulichium along with other 56 wooers. He, with the other suitors, was slain by Odysseus with the aid of Eumaeus, Philoetius, and Telemachus.

See also 
 4791 Iphidamas, Jovian asteroid

Notes

References 

 Apollodorus, The Library with an English Translation by Sir James George Frazer, F.B.A., F.R.S. in 2 Volumes, Cambridge, MA, Harvard University Press; London, William Heinemann Ltd. 1921. ISBN 0-674-99135-4. Online version at the Perseus Digital Library. Greek text available from the same website.
 Dictys Cretensis, from The Trojan War. The Chronicles of Dictys of Crete and Dares the Phrygian translated by Richard McIlwaine Frazer, Jr. (1931-). Indiana University Press. 1966. Online version at the Topos Text Project.
Gaius Julius Hyginus, Fabulae from The Myths of Hyginus translated and edited by Mary Grant. University of Kansas Publications in Humanistic Studies. Online version at the Topos Text Project.
 Homer, The Iliad with an English Translation by A.T. Murray, Ph.D. in two volumes. Cambridge, MA., Harvard University Press; London, William Heinemann, Ltd. 1924. . Online version at the Perseus Digital Library.
 Homer, Homeri Opera in five volumes. Oxford, Oxford University Press. 1920. . Greek text available at the Perseus Digital Library.
 The Orphic Argonautica, translated by Jason Colavito. Online version at the Topos Text Project. 2011.
 Pausanias, Description of Greece with an English Translation by W.H.S. Jones, Litt.D., and H.A. Ormerod, M.A., in 4 Volumes. Cambridge, MA, Harvard University Press; London, William Heinemann Ltd. 1918. . Online version at the Perseus Digital Library
 Pausanias, Graeciae Descriptio. 3 vols. Leipzig, Teubner. 1903.  Greek text available at the Perseus Digital Library.
 Publius Vergilius Maro, Aeneid. Theodore C. Williams. trans. Boston. Houghton Mifflin Co. 1910. Online version at the Perseus Digital Library.
 Publius Vergilius Maro, Bucolics, Aeneid, and Georgics. J. B. Greenough. Boston. Ginn & Co. 1900. Latin text available at the Perseus Digital Library.
 Tzetzes, John, Allegories of the Iliad translated by Goldwyn, Adam J. and Kokkini, Dimitra. Dumbarton Oaks Medieval Library, Harvard University Press, 2015.

Argonauts
Trojans
Achaeans (Homer)
People of the Trojan War
Suitors of Penelope
Characters in the Argonautica